Two for Texas is a 1998 American Western television film directed by Rod Hardy, written by Larry Brothers, and starring Kris Kristofferson, Scott Bairstow, Irene Bedard, Tom Skerritt, Peter Coyote, and Victor Rivers. It is based on the 1982 novel Two for Texas by James Lee Burke. The film premiered on TNT on January 18, 1998.

Plot

Cast 

 Kris Kristofferson as Hugh Allison
 Scott Bairstow as Son Holland
 Irene Bedard as Sana
 Tom Skerritt as Sam Houston
 Peter Coyote as Jim Bowie
 Victor Rivers as Emile Landry
 Tom Schuster as Alcide Landry 
 Rodney A. Grant as Iron Jacket
 Marco Rodríguez as Gen. Santa Anna
 Karey Green as Susannah Dickinson
 Richard Andrew Jones as Deaf Smith 
 Richard Nance as Pike 
 Lonnie Rodriguez as Sergeant Major
 Julio Cesar Cedillo as Lt. Herrera
 Woody Watson as Lt. Burnett
 Carlos Compean as Capt. Trejo
 Alex Morris as Rex 
 James Terry McIlvain as Trusty Luke 
 Mark Dalton as Snake Bite Convict
 Larry Brothers as Clay 
 Rick Dennis as Mac
 Roy Burger as Matt
 Billy L. 'Butch' Frank as Hank
 Rodger Boyce as Ned 
 Daniel O'Callaghan as Jones 
 Robert Lott as Kelly 
 Stephen Madrid as Mexican Peasant
 Yvette Ancira as Emily Morgan
 Gatlin Boone Smith as Baby Dickinson

References

External links
 

1998 television films
1998 films
1998 Western (genre) films
American Western (genre) television films
Films directed by Rod Hardy
TNT Network original films
1990s English-language films